Þóranna Kika Hodge-Carr (born 18 July 1999) is an Icelandic basketball player for Iona College and the Icelandic national team. She started her career with Keflavík in the Icelandic Úrvalsdeild kvenna where she won the national championship in 2017.

Playing career

First seasons and championship (2015–2020)
After coming up through Keflavík junior teams, Þóranna played her first games in the top-tier Úrvalsdeild kvenna during the 2015–2016 season. She helped Keflavík to the national championship in 2017 when they beat three-time defending champions Snæfell in the Úrvalsdeild finals. The next season, she tore an anterior cruciate ligament in her knee. She bounced back the following season and averaged 9.4 points and 5.4 rebounds for Keflavík before the rest of the season and playoffs where canceled in March 2020 due to the coronavirus pandemic in Iceland.

College career (2020–present)
In May 2020, Þóranna agreed to join the Iona College for the 2020–2021 season.

National team career
Þóranna started playing with Iceland's junior national teams in 2014. In 2015, she was named to the U-16 Nordic Championships All-first team. debuted with the Icelandic national team in 2019.

References

External links
Icelandic statistics at kki.is
Iona Gaels profile

1999 births
Living people
Thoranna Kika Hodge-Carr
Thoranna Kika Hodge-Carr
Iona Gaels women's basketball players
Thoranna Kika Hodge-Carr
Thoranna Kika Hodge-Carr